Doddy Édouard (born 17 June 1981) is a Mauritian footballer who currently plays as a striker for Faucon Flacq SC. He won one cap for the Mauritius national football team in 2004. Édouard previously played in Réunion for AS Marsouins.

References

1981 births
Living people
Mauritian footballers
Mauritius international footballers
Mauritian expatriate sportspeople in Réunion
Mauritian expatriate footballers
Association football forwards
AS Rivière du Rempart players